Byung-hoon, also spelled Byeong-hun, is a Korean male given name.

People with this name include:
An Byeong-hun (born 1991), South Korean golfer
Kim Byung-Hoon (born 1982), South Korean field hockey player
On Byung-Hoon (born 1985), South Korean football player
Park Byeong-Hun (born 1973), South Korean sprint canoer
Yoo Byung-Hoon, South Korean Paralympian athlete

Fictional characters with this name include:
Lee/Seo Byung-hoon, in 2010 South Korean film Cyrano Agency and its spin-off 2013 television series Dating Agency: Cyrano

See also
List of Korean given names

Korean masculine given names